"Here's to the Heartache" is a song by American rock band Nothing More. It was their fourth single off of their album Nothing More. It peaked at number 4 on the Billboard Mainstream Rock Songs chart in February 2016.

Background
The song was first released as a single on October 13, 2015. A music video was released a month later. The video was directed by Josh Sobel, with help from cinematographer Alex Bergman, who the band had previously worked with on prior single "Jenny". It features black and white footage of the band performing the song, intermixed with footage of a female figure, representing situations covered in the song's lyrics.

Themes and composition
Lyrically, the song is about celebrating the hardships the band had experienced up to the point of recording their self-titled album. The song is about the concept of coming out as stronger after enduring personal struggles such as ended romantic relationships. Hawkin's stated that the lyrics were inspired by the Steve Maraboli quote of "As I look back on my life, I realize that every time I thought I was being rejected from something good, I was actually being re-directed to something better." He also explained that it was inspired more directly by the band member's past experiences as well:

Loudwire described the song as a "chugging rocker".

Personnel
Credits from album inlay booklet.

Band

 Jonny Hawkins – lead vocals
 Mark Vollelunga – guitar, backing vocals
 Daniel Oliver – bass, keyboards, backing vocals
 Paul O'Brien – drums

Production
 Will Hoffman - production

Charts

References

2015 songs
2015 singles
Nothing More songs
Eleven Seven Label Group singles